Alan Watts was an orator and philosopher of the 20th century. He spent time reflecting on Personal Identity and Higher Consciousness. According to the critic Erik Davis, his "writings and recorded talks still shimmer with a profound and galvanising lucidity." These works are not accessible in the same way as his many books.

Lectures

The following lectures can all be obtained at alanwatts.org .

Is this life a dream?

Watts proposes a thought experiment of imagining that one has total control over the content of each night's dreams. He uses this thought experiment to make a case for the self as the ultimate reality.

What if Money were no object?

Watts argues that there is less difference than generally supposed between what one would want to do if money were no object, and what one should do under actual circumstances. He proposes that the question "What do I desire?" should be given greater emphasis, even under actual circumstances

.

The mind

Watts makes a case for quieting the mind by leaving it alone. He argues that we are "addicted to thoughts" and want to avoid ourselves, and that this quest for self-avoidance leads to a "vicious circle" of worry.

You're IT

War

You are the Universe

The real You

The ego hoax

Being Alive

Choice

Books

Note: ISBNs for titles originally published prior to 1974 are for reprint editions.

Myth and Ritual in Christianity, Thames and Hudson, including essay "God and Satan"

Nature, Man and Woman
Beat Zen Square Zen and Zen
This Is It and Other Essays on Zen and Spiritual Experience, Pantheon Books, 
Psychotherapy East and West, Pantheon Books, 
The Joyous Cosmology: Adventures in the Chemistry of Consciousness
The Two Hands of God: The Myths of Polarity
Beyond Theology: The Art of Godmanship, Pantheon Books, 

Nonsense, illustrations by Greg Irons (a collection of literary nonsense), San Francisco: Stolen Paper Editions
Does It Matter?: Essays on Man's Relation to Materiality, Pantheon Books, 
The Art of Contemplation: A Facsimile Manuscript with Doodles
 , Vintage Books pocket edition 1973, New World Library edition, 2007, 
Cloud-hidden, Whereabouts Unknown: A Mountain Journal, Pantheon Books. Also published in Canada in 1974 by Jonathan Cape, .

Translations

Notes

Watts, Alan